Linnemann is a German surname. Notable people with the surname include:

Carsten Linnemann (born 1977), German politician
Eduard Linnemann (1841–1886), German chemist
Eta Linnemann (1926–2009), German theologian
Felix Linnemann (1882–1948), German executive
James T. Linnemann, American physicist

See also
Linneman

German-language surnames